Eurogamer is a British video game journalism website launched in 1999 and owned by alongside formed company Gamer Network.

Since 2008, it is known for the formerly eponymous games trade fair EGX organised by its parent company, which was called Eurogamer Expo until 2013. From 2013 to 2020, sister site USGamer ran independently under its parent company.

History 

Eurogamer (initially stylised as EuroGamer was launched on 4 September 1999 under company Eurogamer Network. The founding team included John "Gestalt" Bye, the webmaster for the PlanetQuake website and a writer for British magazine PC Gaming World; Patrick "Ghandi" Stokes, a contributor for the website Warzone; and Rupert "rauper" Loman, who had organised the EuroQuake esports event for the game Quake.

Eurogamer hosts content from media outlet Digital Foundry since 2007, which was founded by Richard Leadbetter in 2004. In January 2008, Tom Bramwell overtook the role of editor-in-chief from Kristan Reed, remaining in that role until he resigned in November 2014. Afterwards Oli Welsh served as editor for Eurogamer.

In February 2015, Eurogamer dropped its ten-point scale for review scores instead highlight some games the reviewer felt particularly strongly with labels such as 'Essential', 'Recommended' or 'Avoid'. The change was driven by doubt about the score system's usefulness and its desire to be delisted from review aggregator Metacritic because of its "unhealthy influence" on the games industry. In 2021, the community forum for Eurogamer closed, with the site recommending other platforms such as Discord instead.

Regional websites 
Eurogamer has several regional sub-outlets, with some franchised publications:
 Eurogamer.cz for the Czech Republic.
 Eurogamer.de for Germany; launched in co-operation with Extent Media on 24 August 2006 to coincide with that year's Games Convention exhibition.
 Eurogamer.es for Spain.
 Eurogamer Benelux for Belgium, the Netherlands and Luxembourg (under Eurogamer.nl); launched in August 2008 and headed by Steven De Leeuw.
 Eurogamer.pl for Poland.
 Eurogamer.pt for Portugal; launched in partnership with LusoPlay in May 2008.

Former 
 Brasilgamer for Brazil; established in 2012.
 Eurogamer.dk for Denmark; launched in June 2009 and headed by Kristian West.
 Eurogamer.fr for France; launched as a joint venture with Microscoop in October 2007.
 Eurogamer.it for Italy; closed in 2022.
 Eurogamer.ro for Romania.
 Eurogamer.se for Sweden; established in 2015, closed in 2016.

References

External links 

 

Internet properties established in 1999
Video game Internet forums
Video game news websites
Video gaming in the United Kingdom
1999 establishments in the United Kingdom